The 1997–98 Icelandic Hockey League season was the seventh season of the Icelandic Hockey League, the top level of ice hockey in Iceland. Two teams participated in the league, and Skautafelag Akureyrar won the championship.

Regular season

Final 
 Skautafélag Akureyrar - Ísknattleiksfélagið Björninn 3:0 (7:6 n.V., 9:5, 11:3)

External links 
 1997-98 season

Icelandic Hockey League
Icelandic Hockey League seasons
1997–98 in Icelandic ice hockey